Peter Entell is an American-born documentary filmmaker, living in Switzerland. He has both American and Swiss nationality. He has filmed in Europe, Africa, and Asia on film projects with social, political, and environmental subjects.

Biography 

Entell was born in New York in 1952 and moved to Switzerland in 1975, where he began to work for the United Nations High Commissioner for Refugees (UNHCR) as a sound recordist.

The first film he directed was Moving On: The Hunger for Land in Zimbabwe, at the behest of the Belgian-Zimbabwe Friendship Association.

Other films which Entell produced and directed include:

Depending on Heaven, two films on the life of Mongols in China. (1988)

The Tube, an investigation led by a journalist who tries to discover the truth about how the television affects our brains.  It first was released in 2001.  He re-edited the film in 2009.

Josh’s Trees, the story of the filmmaker’s best friend who dies when his son is less than a year old. Years later the boy is just beginning to ask questions about his father. (2005)

Shake the Devil Off, a film musical about New Orleans after Hurricane Katrina, emphasizing St. Augustine Church and its pastor Jerome LeDoux. (2007)

In 2012, Entell released A Home far Away, about fellow Americans, Broadway, television and Hollywood actress Lois Snow and her husband Edgar Snow, author of the best-selling book Red Star Over China, first American correspondent to interview Mao Tse-tung, and first American to film Mao.

Like Dew in the Sun explores why people can't live together in peace. After centuries of hatred, violence and massacres, Ukraine is at war once again. An opera about a filmmaker’s journey to the land of his ancestors. (2016)

Sisters A story of abandonment and discovery, of silence and of sharing, of how fate has shaped the lives of three women and of how their efforts have changed their lives. 

Getting Old Stinks a filmmaker, his mother and father. The experience of aging – our own, that of our loved ones – and of death. A story shot over fifteen year period, told with humour despite its drama, an ode to life beyond the suffering. 

Entell produces and directs his films himself.

Recognition 

Entell received a Guggenheim Foundation grant in 1988. He was nominated for the Swiss Film Prize for the Best Documentary for Rolling  Also the Canvas Television Prize at the Viewpoint Documentary Now Film Festival, Belgium; Silver Spire Winner at the Golden Gate Festival, USA; Jury Prize at the Parnu Film Festival, Estonia (1997)

Moving On: The Hunger for Land in Zimbabwe : 1st Prize 'Blue Ribbon' -- International Affairs and the John Grierson Award—Best film by a new director at the American Film Festival (1983)

The Testimony of Four South African Workers : International Television Prize at the North-South Media Festival, Geneva, Switzerland; 2nd Prize, 'Struggle for Peace and Justice at the Vermont World Peace Film Festival (1988)

Josh's Trees : Grand Prize of the Jury, Montreal International Film Festival, Canada; Home Movies Award, Biografilm Festival, Italy (2005)

Shake the Devil Off : Best Editing Award, Rencontres internationales du documentaire de Montréal; Best Documentary Feature Film, Nashville Film Festival; Nomination, Best Swiss Film of the Year (2007)

Filmography 

Entell's documentary films include:

Sound engineer 
 Men's Lives – 1976

Direction 

 Moving on: The Hunger for Land in Zimbabwe (Toujours plus loin: la terre convoitée du Zimbabwe) – 1983
 Depending on Heaven (Les caprices du ciel) – 1987
 The Testimony of Four South African Workers (Le témoignage de quatre travailleurs sud-africains) – 1988
 Le manteau de pluie – 1990
 Waiting for the Caribou (En attendant le caribou) – 1991
 L'homme et le chimpanzé – 1991
 La maison du grand âge – 1992
 Martha – 1994
 Rolling – 1997
 The Tube (Le tube) – 2001, re-edited in 2009
 Josh's Trees (Les arbres de Josh) – 2005
 Shake the Devil Off – 2007
 A Home Far Away (Ailleurs, ma maison) – 2012
 Like Dew in the Sun (Comme la rosée au soleil) – 2016
 Sisters (Les sœurs) – 2018
 Getting Old Stinks – 2022

See also 

 Edgar Snow

References

Sources 
 
 
 
 
 
 
 

1952 births
American documentary filmmakers
Living people
Artists from New York City
Film directors from New York City